WLAJ (channel 53) is a television station in Lansing, Michigan, United States, affiliated with ABC and The CW Plus. It is owned by Mission Broadcasting, which maintains a shared services agreement (SSA) with Nexstar Media Group, owner of CBS affiliate WLNS-TV (channel 6), for the provision of certain services. WLAJ and WLNS-TV share studios on East Saginaw Street in Lansing's Eastside section; through a channel sharing agreement, the stations transmit using WLAJ's spectrum from a tower on Van Atta Road in Okemos, Michigan. There is no separate website for WLAJ; instead, it is integrated with that of sister station WLNS-TV.

History
WLAJ began broadcasting on October 13, 1990, operating from a converted appliance store. The station was originally owned by Joel Ferguson, the founding owner of the market's first independent station, WFSL-TV (now Fox affiliate WSYM-TV). Ferguson had used the proceeds from the sale of WFSL to launch WLAJ.

Prior to its sign-on in 1990, Lansing had been one of the biggest markets in the United States without a full-time ABC affiliate, even though it had been large enough to support three full network affiliates since at least the 1960s. However, only two VHF licenses were assigned to the city—channels 6 and 10, occupied by CBS affiliate WLNS and NBC affiliate WILX-TV. UHF was not considered viable even after the FCC mandated all-channel tuning in 1964. Although Lansing is a fairly compact market geographically, it is sandwiched between Detroit to the east, Flint–Saginaw–Bay City to the north, Toledo to the south, and Grand Rapids–Kalamazoo–Battle Creek to the west. Therefore, it was not likely there would have been room to drop in a third VHF allocation. By the 1980s, cable and satellite had gained enough penetration in Mid-Michigan to make a UHF "Big Three" affiliate viable.

Before WLAJ signed on, WJRT-TV in Flint had served as the default ABC outlet for the area from its 1958 sign-on until WLAJ debuted. WFSL had briefly carried a few ABC programs in an abortive attempt to become Lansing's ABC affiliate. Other parts of the market received ABC from WUHQ-TV (now WOTV) in Battle Creek and WXYZ-TV in Detroit. As a condition of WLAJ receiving an ABC affiliation, its transmitter had to be located so there was minimum overlap with WJRT.

Ferguson eventually sold a half-stake in WLAJ to Granite Broadcasting in 1996. Granite had the option of buying out the rest of WLAJ, which it exercised six months later after a brief court battle when the owners of the transmitter site tried to stop the sale from taking place. The station was sold to Freedom Communications in 1999. In 2005, a company-wide consolidation of operations at its stations resulted in the move of WLAJ's master control and most other internal operations to the studios of sister station WWMT in Kalamazoo. This left a skeleton crew of six people out of what began with eighty staffers in Lansing. Additionally, WWMT's president and general manager, James Lutton, took over the same capacity at WLAJ after the departure of Ross Reardon.

On September 24, 2007, WLAJ was re-branded as "ABC 3" since most Lansing-area cable providers carry it on channel 3. The logo introduced at that time featured the number "53" but emphasized its cable slot ("3") more than the over-the-air channel, with the "5" in negative space. WOTV used a similar logo at the time. On April 7, 2008, a new image makeover including a new logo, similar to WWMT's, but with the hidden "5" like the previous logo was launched. It eventually dropped the hidden "5". WLAJ was unusual for airing The Oprah Winfrey Show at 5 p.m. instead of her traditional 4 p.m. timeslot. The series ended on May 25, 2011, and The Ellen DeGeneres Show replaced Oprah on WLAJ.

WLAJ also aired ESPN Plus' Big Ten college football coverage until the launch of the Big Ten Network. While most ABC affiliates in Michigan saw their college football coverage reduced primarily to the network's games, WLAJ and WLAJ-DT2 have in recent years become the Lansing affiliate of the Central Michigan University Chippewas and the Western Michigan University Broncos. Today, whenever a football game involving either CMU or WMU kicks off at noon, the game airs on WLAJ as a lead-in to ABC's college football coverage. All other CMU and WMU football games air on WLAJ-DT2.

Freedom announced on November 2, 2011, that it would bow out of television and sell its stations, including WLAJ, to the Sinclair Broadcast Group. The deal closed on April 2, 2012, but only six months later (on October 11), Sinclair filed to sell WLAJ to Shield Media (owned by White Knight Broadcasting vice president Sheldon Galloway). After the sale's completion, the station then entered into a shared services  agreement with Young Broadcasting-owned WLNS. The Federal Communications Commission (FCC) granted its approval of the license assignment on December 4; the sale was completed on March 1. This transaction resulted in Young controlling four of the six largest English-language network affiliates in Lansing (CBS, ABC, The CW, and MyNetworkTV). On April 1, 2013, WLAJ's master control moved from WWMT's studios to the WLNS facility in Lansing. Most internal operations moved to WLNS as well. WLAJ also shut down its local advertising sales office and former news studio on South Pennsylvania Avenue. In effect, the move reunited WHTV's intellectual unit with WLAJ since the former station was once housed at the ABC outlet's studios. However, WLNS technically operated WHTV through an already established separate outsourcing arrangement from WLAJ.

In August 2013, WLAJ returned to branding itself as "ABC 53" using the updated ABC logo. Young Broadcasting merged with Media General on November 12, 2013. As a result of these changes, WHTV announced it would not renew its operational outsourcing agreement with WLNS. In July 2014, WHTV entered into a new local marketing agreement with WSYM (then owned by the Journal Broadcast Group) and relocated its advertising sales operation to that outlet's studios.

On August 21, 2020, it was announced that Mission Broadcasting would acquire WLAJ. The acquisition was completed on November 23.

WLAJ-DT2 
On September 21, 1998, alongside the launch of The WB 100+ Station Group (The WB 100+), WLAJ began operating a cable-only affiliate of The WB which was part of the national service. This was available exclusively on Comcast channel 30, had its own logo, and used the "WBL" call sign in a fictional manner. From 2002 until 2006, the internal operations (such as advertising sales) of UPN affiliate WHTV were housed at WLAJ's studios. That station then relocated to the WLNS facility after entering into a joint sales agreement with WLNS' then-owner Young Broadcasting. Prior to 1998, The WB programming was available in the Lansing market via WGN's national feed, or off-market stations, such as WXON (now WMYD) in Detroit. On January 24, 2006, CBS Corporation (which split from Viacom after 2005) and Warner Bros. Television (the company which owned The WB) announced they then would cease operating the UPN and The WB networks and combine their resources to create a programming service entitled The CW. The letters would represent the first initial of the new network's respective corporate parents.

On February 22, News Corporation announced that it would start up another new network called MyNetworkTV. This new service, which would be a sister network to Fox, would be operated by Fox Television Stations and its syndication division 20th Television. MyNetworkTV was launched on September 5 and former UPN affiliate WHTV joined the network. This left WBL to affiliate with The CW via The CW Plus, a service similar to The WB 100+, on September 18. On that date, WLAJ created a new second digital subchannel to simulcast WBL and offer non-cable subscribers access to The CW. That channel then began using the WLAJ-DT2 call letters in an official manner and relocated to Comcast channel 5.

News operation
WLAJ launched a news department (under the branding 53 Newsbeat) a month after it began operations. However, after only fifteen months, station management decided to pull the plug on the production and replace it with simulcasts of Action News from WXYZ. Due to continual low ratings, this was eventually replaced by syndicated programming. In 1997, it re-launched a news operation but still found itself with few viewers having to compete with established broadcasts at longtime dominant WLNS and runner-up WILX-TV.

New weeknight 6 p.m. and 11 p.m. broadcasts were branded as ABC 53 News Now and featured anchor Joe Parker, sports with Shaun Broyls, and weather outsourced to the National Weather Network (now known as WeatherVision) of Jackson, Mississippi. Kirk Montgomery eventually took over as meteorologist after an in-house weather department was added. After Freedom bought the station in 1999, a management change occurred and sales manager Mike King (from sister station WWMT) was brought in as the new general manager at WLAJ.

During this time, the news department won several awards including Best Newscast from the Associated Press. Initially retaining the ABC 53 News Now branding, the shows were eventually relaunched as ABC 53 News Express which consisted of ten minutes of news, weather, and sports followed by an interview segment. Parker left in 2002 to become the main weeknight anchor at Freedom's WRGB in Albany, New York, and was replaced by Darcy Sullivan. Despite the new format and the critical acclaim, WLAJ was still unable to make significant headway in the ratings. It frequently found itself as the third station in a two-station market, with WLNS and WILX waging a fierce battle for first. Eventually, Suzanne Wangler (using her on-air name "Suzanne Page") from Detroit's WDIV-TV replaced Darcy Sullivan as producer and news anchor. Cathy Younkin from WWMT replaced Jim Fordyce as news director and Hondo Carpenter remained sports director.

On September 24, 2007, a significant change occurred at WLAJ after the station dropped the News Express format for its newscasts. The news production returned to a more traditional presentation complete with a newly renovated set at its South Pennsylvania Avenue studios. The station began producing full-length newscasts branded as ABC 3 News (referring to its on-air identification based on its universal cable channel location). By this point, WLAJ was airing local news weeknights at 6 p.m. and 11 p.m. and also introduced a prime time newscast at 10 p.m. on its CW-affiliated second digital subchannel. The half-hour prime time program on the subchannel, called ABC 3 News Live at 10 on CW 5, competed with another sixty-minute local newscast seen every night at the same time on Fox outlet WSYM (which has all of its news programming produced by WILX).

On February 15, 2008, Suzanne Wangler (who anchored under the name "Suzanne Page") resigned as the anchor/producer/news director of WLAJ. Wangler cited the "stress" of the job serving in her position leading to her resignation. She previously had a week-long absence due to family problems. Her resignation, however, may have been due to an investigation where she was accused of taking almost $150,000 from an Oakland County man named Les Pingilley. The charges led to an Investigators report at WXYZ by Heather Catallo. On February 23, Wangler was found dead in her home by police. According to Detroit's Fox owned-and-operated station WJBK (channel 2), it was an "apparent suicide" and she "had hanged herself." Also according to that station, she went to a local police department to get her blood alcohol level checked for a previous driving under the influence charge. Her blood alcohol content tested at 0.05% (0.08% is legally drunk in Michigan). However, due to prior offenses, she was not allowed to have any alcohol in her system. A family member discovered her dead around 3 p.m. that day and called police. An autopsy to find the exact cause of death was scheduled; it was confirmed by the autopsy as suicide by hanging.

Since WLAJ lacked a weather department, all weather forecasts were taped in advance by meteorologists from WWMT's studios on West Maple Street in Kalamazoo. Except for a news anchor and sports director based in Lansing, WLAJ maintained a very minimal news presence in Lansing with only two news reporters. Additional reporters from WWMT were included when coverage was presented that featured a regional and/or statewide interest. On weekdays from 7 a.m. until 9 a.m., WLAJ aired news and weather cut-ins (at :25 and :55 past the hour) during Good Morning America that were recorded in advance by WWMT personnel. At some point in time, its 6 p.m. broadcast was expanded to an hour displacing ABC World News With Charles Gibson to a 30-minute delay at 7 p.m. Despite a credible effort to offer a third option of newscasts in Lansing, WLAJ finally discontinued its news department altogether on September 25, 2009.

As a result, WWMT began producing a five-minute news and weather brief seen weeknights at 11 p.m. (which was taped earlier in the evening) featuring rotating WWMT personalities. Known as ABC 3 News Update, regional and state coverage was presented during the show since WLAJ no longer maintained any news-related personnel at its studios in Lansing. WWMT also continued to provide WLAJ with taped local weather cut-ins during Good Morning America on weekday mornings. All news and weather updates on this outlet were upgraded to high definition level on April 16, 2011, after WWMT made the switch.

At some point in March 2013 after WLNS took over operations of WLAJ, all of the WWMT-produced news and weather cut-ins were dropped. On April 1, WLNS began simulcasting its weeknight 6 p.m. and 11 pm newscasts on WLAJ. Their morning newscast started simulcasting (from 5 a.m. until 7 a.m.) on April 15 and includes separate, recorded cut-ins during Good Morning America. In addition to its main studios, WLNS operates a bureau within the Jackson Citizen Patriot newsroom on East Michigan Avenue in downtown Jackson. Unlike most ABC affiliates, WLAJ does not air midday news during the week, a 5 p.m. weeknight show, or weekend newscasts. As a CW Plus station, WLAJ-DT2 formerly aired the nationally syndicated weekday morning show The Daily Buzz, replacing it with paid programming in June 2014. The CW Plus dropped the show in September 2014.

Technical information

The station's digital signal is multiplexed:

In 2014, WLAJ began carrying the Justice Network on a newly created third subchannel.

WLNS sold its spectrum in the FCC spectrum auction, and reached a channel sharing agreement with WLAJ. On June 11, 2018; WLNS discontinued broadcasting from its transmitter in Okemos and began broadcasting from WLAJ's transmitter in Rives Junction on channel 25; it continues to appear as channel 6 via PSIP. This created a situation where the senior partner in an operating agreement transmits on the spectrum of its junior partner. As a consequence of the WLNS channel share, and the need to transmit three high-definition signals (1080i for WLNS, and 720p for WLAJ's two ABC and CW channels), WLAJ dropped Justice Network from its third subchannel. In 2020, the transmitter was moved to the old WLNS transmitter location in Okemos.

Analog-to-digital conversion 
WLAJ shut down its analog signal, over UHF channel 53, on June 12, 2009, as part of the federally mandated transition from analog to digital television. The station's digital signal remained on its pre-transition UHF channel 51, using PSIP to display WLAJ's virtual channel as 53 on digital television receivers, which was among the high band UHF channels (52-69) that were removed from broadcasting use as a result of the transition. On May 22, 2015, WLAJ relocated its digital signal to UHF channel 25, with the FCC license issued on June 5, 2015.

See also
Channel 14 digital TV stations in the United States
Channel 53 virtual TV stations in the United States

References

External links

ABC network affiliates
Television channels and stations established in 1990
LAJ
1990 establishments in Michigan
Nexstar Media Group